The Treaty of Nöteborg, also known as the Treaty of Oreshek (Russian: Ореховский мир), is a conventional name for the peace treaty signed at Oreshek on 12 August 1323. It was the first settlement between Sweden and the Novgorod Republic regulating their border mostly in the area that is also known as Finland today. Three years later, Novgorod signed the Treaty of Novgorod with the Norwegians.

Name 
The treaty had no special name at the time, as it was just called a "permanent peace" between the parties. Modern English language publications most often use the name "Treaty of Nöteborg" for it, which is a direct translation of Nöteborgsfreden by which the treaty has conventionally been referred to in the Swedish language literature. "Treaty of Oreshek" is a similar translation from the Russian Ореховский мир. Both "Nöteborg" and "Oreshek" are old names of a fortress in Shlisselburg, used respectively in Swedish and Russian.

Recently, the name "Treaty of Pähkinäsaari" has appeared in some of the English language literature, as a direct translation of the contemporary Finnish name of the treaty, Pähkinäsaaren rauha. "Pähkinäsaari" was and is the Finnish name for the island on which the fortress was built. The Finnish name means literally 'nut island', and is cognate with the Swedish name ('nöt' meaning nut).

Contents 
The original text of the treaty has been lost. It has survived in partial copies in Russian, Swedish, and Latin, which are somewhat conflicting.

The treaty was negotiated with the help of Hanseatic merchants in order to conclude the Swedish-Novgorodian Wars. As a token of goodwill, Novgorod ceded three Karelian parishes to Sweden; Sweden would in turn stay out of any conflict between Novgorod and Danish Duchy of Estonia. Both sides would also promise to refrain from building castles on the new border.

The treaty defined the border as beginning east and north of Viborg Castle, running along the Sestra and Volchya Rivers, splitting the Karelian Isthmus in half, running across Savonia and, according to traditional interpretations, ending in the Gulf of Bothnia near the Pyhäjoki River. However the wording "the sea in the north" can as well mean the Arctic Ocean.

Only the southern part of the border, close to Viborg, was actually considered important and clearly defined in the treaty. Borders in the wilderness were defined very roughly, and presumably considered less important than the line across the Karelian Isthmus. It has also been suggested that the treaty would have originally given both Sweden and Novgorod joint rights to northern Ostrobothnia and Lappland.

Aftermath 
Finnic tribes living on both sides of the border, mainly Karelians, Finns, and Tavastians, had no say in the treaty. Sweden and Novgorod had already de facto established their areas of influence in eastern Fennoscandia, with Karelians under Russian rule and other tribes in the west under Swedish rule. The treaty established international approval for that structure, but the concept of "permanent peace" did not have much effect on the long-term conflict between Novgorod and Sweden.  The northern part of the border crossed wide stretches of wilderness in which the Hansa and its diplomats were not interested, but these areas became a bone of contention between Sweden and Novgorod soon thereafter. Within five years after the treaty was signed, Swedish colonists started making inroads into northern Ostrobothnia. Sweden also established castles at Uleåborg around 1375 and Olofsborg in 1475, clearly on the Novgorodian side of the border.

In 1595,  the Treaty of Teusina acknowledged the Swedish text as the correct one. However, long before that, Sweden had succeeded in permanently taking over large areas on the Novgorod side of the original border, including Ostrobothnia and Savonia. Eventually, the territory west of the border, along with the expanse to the north, evolved into the country known today as Finland.

See also
Birkarls
List of treaties

References

Further reading
 
 
 
Ingrid Bohn Finland: From the Origins to Our Times (Riva Publishers)

External links
Nöteborgsfreden och Finlands medeltida östgräns. Andra delen  (Svenska litteratursällskapet i Finland, Nr 427:2, VIII + s. 239-509.  Jarl Gallén, John Lind. 1991)

Noteborg
Noteborg
14th century in Finland
1323 in Europe
History of the Karelian Isthmus
Noteborg
Treaties of the Novgorod Republic